Kharod is a town and a nagar panchayat in Janjgir-Champa district in the Indian state of Chhattisgarh. Kharod is historically very important place for Chhattisgarh.

According to 2011 census total population of kharod is 10,193.

Geography
It has an average elevation of 240 metres (787 feet).

Demographics
 India census,  Kharod has an average literacy rate of 60%, higher than the national average of 59.5%: male literacy is 74%, and female literacy is 46%. In Kharod, 17% of the population is under 6 years of age.

EDUCATIONAL INSTITUTE

Government laxamaneswar college

References

2011 census data of India

Cities and towns in Janjgir-Champa district